Edward I. Altman (born June 5, 1941) is a Professor of Finance, Emeritus, at New York University's Stern School of Business. He is best known for the development of the Altman Z-score for predicting bankruptcy which he published in 1968. Professor Altman is a leading academic on the High-Yield and Distressed Debt markets and is the pioneer in the building of models for credit risk management and bankruptcy prediction.

Altman used to teach "Bankruptcy and Reorganization" and "Credit Risk Management" in the Risk Management Open Enrollment program for 
Stern Executive Education., as well as on the TRIUM Global Executive MBA Program, an alliance of NYU Stern, the London School of Economics and HEC School of Management, and for both the Master of Science in Global Finance (MSGF) and Master of Science in Risk Management Program for Executives (MSRM).  MSGF is jointly offered by NYU Stern and the Hong Kong University of Science and Technology. He also teaches in the school's MBA programs and has been a Stern faculty member since 1967.

Research
The Altman Z-score is a multivariate formula for a measurement of the financial health of a company and a powerful diagnostic tool that forecasts the probability of a company entering bankruptcy. Studies measuring the effectiveness of the Z-Score have shown that the model has an 80%–90% reliability. Altman's equation did an excellent job at distinguishing bankrupt and non-bankrupt firms and is used by a large number of investment managers and hedge funds in their investment strategies and management. In addition, his Z-score model has been used by management of distressed companies to avoid having to file for bankruptcy reorganization. Altman's models have been used by banking institutions throughout the world in order to quantify the probability of default of their lending portfolios.

He compared owning the debt vs. equity for major companies that went bankrupt. The debt did better. One columnist wrote that a particular case was a goldmine for the debt and a landmine for the stock.

In the 1990s Altman and his PhD student Professor Edith Hotchkiss coined the term Chapter 22, which refers to companies which file for bankruptcy more than once. In a 1990 study he also defined the term "distressed debt securities," pertaining to firms whose bonds yield more than 10% above the "risk-free" government bond rate.

Background
Altman holds a B.A. in Economics, (CCNY, 1963); an MBA (UCLA, 1965); and a Ph.D. in Finance (UCLA, 1967).

Altman was inducted into the Fixed Income Society's Hall of Fame in 2001 and was an inaugural inductee into the Turnaround Management's Hall of Fame  in 2008. Altman has been awarded Honorary Doctorates from Lund University (Sweden) in 2011 and the Warsaw School of Economics in 2014. He also was named Honorary Professor by the University of Buenos Aires (Argentina) in 1996 and Vigo University (Spain) in 2017. He was named one of the "100 Most Influential People in Finance" by the Treasury & Risk Management magazine in 2005. He is also a co-founder of the International Risk Management Conference, which celebrated its 10th anniversary in 2017.

He is the brother of Stuart Altman, a noted health care economist, and Ellen Altman-Stein an MBA in Special Education.

Books
Altman is the author, co-author, or editor of 25 books, including:

Altman Z-score

References

External links 
Homepage
DefaultRisk.com Profile
Master of Science in Risk Management Program for Executives 
International Risk Management Conference
The Risk Banking and Finance Society

1941 births
Living people
New York University Stern School of Business faculty
Corporate finance theorists
City College of New York alumni
UCLA Anderson School of Management alumni